Crary Mountains are a group of ice-covered volcanoes in Marie Byrd Land, Antarctica. They consist of two or three shield volcanoes, named Mount Rees, Mount Steere and Mount Frakes, which developed during the course of the Miocene and Pliocene and last erupted about 30,000-40,000 years ago. Boyd Ridge is another part of the mountain range and lies southeast of Mount Frakes; it might be the emergent part of a platform that underlies the mountain range.

The volcanoes consist mainly of basalt, trachyte and phonolite in the form of lava flows, scoria and hydrovolcanic formations. Volcanic activity here is linked to the West Antarctic Rift system, which is responsible for the formation of a number of volcanoes in the region. During their existence, the range was affected by glaciation and glacial-volcanic interactions.

Geography and geomorphology 

It was first visited in 1959–1960, and several accessible outcrops were sampled. The name refers to Albert P. Crary, who was then Deputy Chief Scientist for the US-IGY Antarctic Program.

The volume of the volcanoes exceeds  and the edifices consist of lavas, hydrovolcanic deposits such as hyaloclastite, fragments of pillow lavas and tuffs, and scoria. Unlike many other mountains in Marie Byrd Land, which owing to a lack of erosion display only their highest and youngest parts, in the Crary Mountains the internal structure of the volcanoes are well exposed due to glacial erosion. The Crary Mountains form a drainage divide for the West Antarctic Ice Sheet; they dam it, which is thus higher on the southwestern side of the range. Debris stripes have been observed on the ice near the foot of the mountains.

Volcanic rocks crop out at Trabucco Cliff on its northeastern flank. There is no caldera. Glacial erosion has cut deep cirques into the eastern flank of Mount Rees, and volcanic outcrops indicate that volcanic rocks alternate between subglacial formations and subaerial formations. Outcrops consist of breccia and lavas, which in one case are intruded by a dike.

Lie Cliff is a volcanic outcrop on the northeastern flank. Mount Steere is heavily dissected, bears evidence of former glaciation in the form of moraines and cirques have been eroded into its northern and northeastern flanks. As with Mount Rees, volcanic rocks alternate between these that formed subglacially and these formed subaerially. Outcrops feature breccias and lava with numerous intruded dikes.

South of Mount Steere is Mount Frakes, with  it is the highest peak in the range and the least eroded of the Crary Mountains. Volcanic rocks crop out both on the southern and western flank, at Morrison Rocks and English Rock respectively. These outcrops are cinder cones that formed on the slopes of Mount Frakes. Volcanic and nonvolcanic boulders on the slopes of Mount Frakes may either be xenoliths or glacial erratics.

Runyon Rock crops out to its east and is the only area of Boyd Ridge not covered by ice. Cinders and a cliff of hyaloclastite are found there.

The volcanoes rise from a platform formed by lava flows and pyroclastic rocks. This platform lies at about  elevation and the Boyd Ridge may be a southeastward extension thereof. It appears that the platform — which crops out only on the eastern side of the Crary Mountains — was tilted westward by faulting. Echo and magnetic sounding have imaged the root of the Crary Mountains in the West Antarctic Ice Sheet, finding that the underlying terrain is steep and flanked by narrow troughs. The mountains are associated with a strong magnetic anomaly that may reflect subglacial rocks containing magnetite.

Geology 

Cenozoic volcanism in Marie Byrd Land is related to the West Antarctic Rift and has been explained by the activity of a mantle plume. This plume either underlies Marie Byrd Land and its volcanoes, or it rose to the surface before Antarctica separated from New Zealand during the middle Cretaceous and induced volcanism across the continental borderlands of the Southwest Pacific. In the latter theory, the Marie Byrd Land volcanism is caused by a remnant plume head underneath the continent. The basement crops out along the coast and consists of granitoids and metamorphic sediments left by a Devonian-Cretaceous volcanic arc.

This volcanism manifests itself with 18 large and numerous smaller volcanoes, which occur in groups, rows or as solitary systems in Marie Byrd Land. The smaller centres are found at the foot of the larger centres, as parasitic vents on their slopes or along the coast. These vents have produced alkali basalt, basanite and hawaiite.

Composition 

Basalt occurs at all four volcanoes. Phonolite and trachyte are found at Mount Rees and Mount Steere, the former also at Mount Frakes; Mount Rees also features rhyolite. Phenocrysts include clinopyroxene, magnetite, olivine and plagioclase. The magma erupted in the Crary Mountains originated in the mantle and underwent fractional crystallization after formation.

Geologic history 

The Crary Mountains were active between 9.3 and 0.04 million years ago during the Miocene and Pliocene. The youngest dates have been obtained by argon-argon dating on Mount Frakes, and imply an eruption 35,000±10,000–32,000±10,000 years ago. These ages were obtained on English Rock, which has also yielded ages of 826,000±79,000–851,000±36,000 and 1.62±0.02 million years ago. Tephra deposits in ice cores recovered at Byrd Station may have originated at Marie Byrd Land volcanoes such as these of the Crary Mountains.

The maximum age of each volcano decreases in southeastward direction, from 9.34±0.24 million years old Mount Rees to 2.67±0.39 million years old Boyd Ridge. The pattern of volcanism migrating along the chain has been observed at other mountain ranges such as the Executive Committee Range, where it takes place at a pace of  like at the Crary Mountains. It is directed away from the centre of the Marie Byrd Land volcanic province and may reflect the propagation of a fracture in the crust.

West Antarctica has been subject to glaciation since the Oligocene, where a perhaps local ice cap or snow deposit existed at Mount Petras. Volcanoes erupting through ice leave specific geologic structures which can be used to reconstruct the timing and extent of past glaciations. Geologic evidence at the Crary Mountains implies that a substantial West Antarctic Ice Sheet existed during the Miocene, and that fluctuations in its size may have stressed the crust and modulated the activity of volcanoes in its area. Before its formation the Crary Mountains might have been islands. In the Crary Mountains, ice occurred either in the form of slope ice when the mountains were erupting or as a thick continental ice sheet. The glaciers were cold-based and thus did not produce tillites or glacial surfaces, and were probably thin. Glacial erosion took place mainly between 8.55 and 4.17 million years ago; it formed the cirques in Mount Rees and Mount Steere and transported glacial erratics on the mountains.

See also
Runyon Rock

References

Sources

External links 

 
 

Crary Mountains
Volcanoes of Marie Byrd Land
Miocene shield volcanoes
Pliocene shield volcanoes
Pleistocene shield volcanoes